The Mariscal Ramón Castilla Province (Spanish mariscal marshal, "Marshall Ramón Castilla") is one of the eight provinces in the Loreto Region of Peru. It was created by Law No. 22728 on October 18, 1979 by President Francisco Morales Bermúdez. The province was named after Ramón Castilla.

Its territory is mostly flat and covered by the Amazon Rainforest.

Political division
The province is divided into four districts.

 Pebas (Pebas)
 Ramón Castilla (Caballococha)
 San Pablo (San Pablo de Loreto)
 Yavari (Amelia)

References 
  Instituto Nacional de Estadística e Informática. Banco de Información Digital. Retrieved November 3, 2007.

Provinces of the Loreto Region